Chocolate Synthesizer is the fourth studio album by Boredoms. It was originally released via WEA Japan and Reprise Records in 1994. It was recorded in four days and mixed in a week. In 2013, it was re-released on vinyl by the California-based label 1972.

Early Japanese editions of the album were packaged with a coupon offering a free mail-order only 3-inch CD, titled Super Roots 2, only available to Japanese addresses.

Reception

Jon Wiederhorn of Rolling Stone gave the album 3 stars out of 5, saying, "Without question, the Boredoms are one of the most bizarre, adventurous bands on the planet, but for anyone who doesn't thrill to disjointed beats and cacophonous clatter, Chocolate Synthesizer may be a tough sweet to swallow." Meanwhile, Keith Kawaii of Tiny Mix Tapes gave the album 4.5 out of 5, saying, "The noise rock thing has been done before, of course, but rarely has it stretched this far in every direction, and rarely has it been so successful." Douglas Wolk of CMJ New Music Monthly called it "their most extraordinary and conceptually unified work to date."

In 2007, Rolling Stone Japan placed Chocolate Synthesizer at number 25 on its list of the "100 Greatest Japanese Rock Albums of All Time".

Track listing

References

External links
 

1994 albums
Boredoms albums
Reprise Records albums